The Chulabhorn International College of Medicine, Thammasat University or CICM is the twenty-first medical school set up in Thailand located in Khlong Luang District, Pathum Thani Province and is the first institution in Thailand to provide an international course in medicine. The first year course consists of general sciences, followed by preclinical years 2 and 3 and then the clinical years 4–6. During the clinical years, Thammasat University Hospital is used as the main training site and students may undertake electives in foreign countries.

CICM was opened on 28 August 2012 to provide medical education in English as an international course. The setup of the university involved a cooperation between Thammasat University and Bumrungrad International Hospital.

Teaching Hospitals 

 Thammasat University Hospital

See also 

 List of medical schools in Thailand

References 

Article incorporates material from the corresponding article in the Thai Wikipedia.

Thammasat University
Medical schools in Thailand
2012 establishments in Thailand
Pathum Thani province
University departments in Thailand